Peter Paul Rubens painted the Adoration of the Magi (Matthew 2:1ff) more often than any other episode from the life of Christ. The subject offered the Counter-Reformation artist the chance to depict the richest worldly panoply, rich textiles, exotic turbans and other incidents, with a range of human types caught up in a dramatic action that expressed the humbling of the world before the Church, embodied in Madonna and child. The most notable include:

 Adoration of the Magi (Rubens, Madrid), 1609, reworked 1628–29
 Adoration of the Magi (Rubens, Lyon), c.1617–18
 Adoration of the Magi (Rubens, Antwerp), 1624
 Adoration of the Magi (Rubens, Cambridge), c.1634

References

Paintings by Peter Paul Rubens